Miss Thailand Universe 2006, the 7th Miss Thailand Universe pageant held at Centara Grand at Central Plaza Ladprao Bangkok, in Bangkok, Thailand on March 25, 2006. The 44 contestants arrived in Nakhon Sawan to do some activities a week earlier before coming back to Bangkok to compete in the final round.

In the final round, broadcast live on BBTV Channel 7, Charm Onwarin Osathanond, was crowned Miss Thailand Universe 2006 by Natalie Glebova, Miss Universe 2005 from Canada.

Charm Onwarin Osathanond represented Thailand in Miss Universe 2006 pageant in Los Angeles, United States. She is the first Thai representatives in 18 years that can be in semi-finalists round after Porntip Nakhirunkanok, Miss Universe 1988 did in 1988.

Results

Placements
Color keys

The winner and two runner-up were awarded to participate internationally (two title from the Big Four international beauty pageants and two minor international beauty pageants) positions were given in the following order:

Special awards

Delegates

External links 
 Miss Thailand Universe official website

2006
2006 in Bangkok
2006 beauty pageants
March 2006 events in Thailand
Beauty pageants in Thailand